Jessica Bell (born 1981) is an Australian singer-songwriter, author, writing and publishing coach, and graphic designer. She has published a memoir, five novels, three poetry collections, and her bestselling series Writing in a Nutshell. She has been featured in a variety of publications and ABC Radio National shows such as Writer's Digest, Publishers Weekly, The Music, Life Matters, and Poetica.

She is also the Publisher of Vine Leaves Press, CEO of Independent Publishing Assistance, and a voice-over actor.

In October 2016, she became the lead singer of the dream-pop group, Keep Shelly in Athens. She also records and performs as a solo artist under the name BRUNO. and the singer and co-songwriter of Mongoa

Biography 

Bell was born in Melbourne, Australia. In 1998, her high school band, String Bridge, made it to the state finals of the national battle-of-the-bands, run in conjunction with the Rock Eisteddfod. In 1999, 'String Bridge' became 'spAnk', and the band went on to win the Melbourne University National Campus Band Competition and third prize in the state. They received radio airplay and gigs, including supports with Killing Heidi. In 2003, the band broke up when Bell moved to Greece. There she completed her Bachelor of Arts via Deakin University's correspondence program, and in 2005 landed her first job as an English Language Teaching book editor and writer for CENGAGE Learning (formerly New Editions) in Athens. Since then, Bell has worked in-house and as a freelancer for Pearson Education, Macmillan Education, Education First and Harper Collins ELT. Between 2005 and 2008, Bell regularly performed as a solo artist in Athens, Greece under her own name, including supports with Oneida (2006) and Holly Golightly (2006, 2008). In 2008, Bell began to focus on her writing, and in 2011 her debut novel, String Bridge (Lucky Press LLC), was published. When Lucky Press liquidated in less than a year after its release, Bell ventured into self-publishing, and has since then worked as a writer, publisher, and book cover designer. In 2017, Bell quit her role as an editor for ELT publishing to focus on her own creative projects and businesses.

Bibliography

Nonfiction
 Go: A Memoir about Binge-drinking, Self-hatred, and Finding Happiness (2021) ISBN 9781925965568
 Dear Reflection: I Never Meant to be a Rebel (2017) ISBN 9781925417555

How-To-Books
 Can You Make the Title Bigga? The Chemistry of Book Cover Design (2022) ISBN 9786188607767
 Self-Publish Your Book: A Quick & Easy Step-by-Step Guide (2019) (Revised Edition) ISBN 9781925417883 
 Polish Your Fiction: A Quick & Easy Self-Editing Guide (2014) ISBN 9780992509712
 Writing in a Nutshell: Writing Workshops to Improve Your Craft (2014) ISBN 9780987593177
 The Six Senses in a Nutshell: Demonstrated Transitions from Bleak to Bold Narrative (2015) (Revised Edition) ISBN 9781925417098
 Adverbs & Clichés in a Nutshell: Demonstrated Subversions of Adverbs & Clichés into Gourmet Imagery (2015) (Revised Edition) ISBN 9781925417081
 Show & Tell in a Nutshell: Demonstrated Transitions from Telling to Showing (2015) (Revised Edition) ISBN 9781925417074

Novels
 How Icasia Bloom Touched Happiness (2021) ISBN 9781925965605
 White Lady (2014) ISBN 9780992509736
 Bitter Like Orange Peel (1st Ed. 2013) ISBN 978-0987593115 (2nd Ed. 2016) ISBN 9781925417487
 The Book (1st Ed. 2013) ISBN 9781481179300 (2nd Ed. 2016) ISBN 9781925417463
 String Bridge (1st Ed. 2011) ISBN 9780984631742 (2nd Ed. 2013) ISBN 9781482097979 (3rd Ed. 2016) ISBN 9781925417449

Poetry
 A Tide Should Be Able to Rise Despite Its Moon (2023) ISBN 9783988320940
 Muted & She (2016) ISBN 9781925417524
 SHE: a short story in verse (2015) ISBN 9781500431112
 muted: a short story in verse (2013) ISBN 9781489556417
 Fabric (1st Ed. 2012) ISBN 9781475168549 (2nd Ed. 2016) ISBN 9781925417418
 Twisted Velvet Chains (1st Ed. 2011) ISBN 9781461108467 (2nd Ed. 2016) ISBN 9781925417425

Anthologies (contributor)
 Women's Work (2013) ISBN 9780987382535
 Poetry Pact Volume 1 (2012) ISBN 9781477539545
 From Stage Door Shadows (2012) ISBN 9780987112682
 Classifieds: An Anthology of Prose Poems (2012) ISBN 9780984565931
 100 Stories for Queensland (2011) ISBN 9780987112620
 Tribute to the Stars (2011) ISBN 9781617061387
 Poems from the Dark Side (2011) ISBN 9781617061295
 Static Poetry II (2011) ISBN 9781617061066
 Static Poetry (2011) ISBN 9781617060953
 Literary Foray (2010) ISBN 9781617060724
 School Days: Tales with an Edge (2010) ISBN 9781617060700
 Something from the Attic (2010) ISBN 9781617060649

Anthologies (compiler and editor)
 The 50-Word Stories of 2022: Microfiction for Lovers of Quick Reads (50 Give or Take #2) (2022) ISBN 9786188607750
 The 50-Word Stories of 2021: Microfiction for Lovers of Quick Reads (50 Give or Take #1) (2021) ISBN 9781925965742
 Vine Leaves Literary Journal: a Collection of Vignettes from Across the Globe (2017) ISBN 9781925417630
 Vine Leaves Literary Journal Issues 10 – 18 ISSN 2204-4574
 The Best of Vine Leaves Literary Journal 2015 (2015) ISBN 9781925417043
 The Best of Vine Leaves Literary Journal 2014 (2014) ISBN 9780992509774
 The Best of Vine Leaves Literary Journal 2012 (2012) ISBN 9780987500045
 The Best of Vine Leaves Literary Journal 2013 (2013) ISBN 9780987593139
 The Best of Vine Leaves Literary Journal 2012 (2012) ISBN 9780987500045

English language teaching
 The New Build Up Your Writing Skills (2014) ISBN 9789604920020
 Business English Projects (2009) ISBN 9783037580608
 Cinderella Theatrical Reader Teacher's Guide (2008) ISBN 9789604034222
 Flying Carpets Junior A Resource Pack (2008) ISBN 9789604472239
 Flying Carpets Junior B Resource Pack (2008) ISBN 9789604472369
 Super Star 2 Test Book (2006) ISBN 9789604034161

Discography

Jessica Bell
 spAnk (1998)
 Ash 11 (2004)
 Solo (2006)
 The Girl Who Fell (2008)
 Mess of Me (2009)
 Honeymoon (2010)
 Melody Hill: On the Other Side (Soundtrack to debut novel String Bridge, 2011)
 Electrip (2014)
 Before I Was Born (2014)

Keep Shelly in Athens
 Philokalia (Athenian Aura Recordings, 2017)
 Introvert EP (Athenian Aura Recordings, 2018)
 Bendable / Glistening 7" (Cascine, 2018)
 (Don't Fear) The Reaper Single (Athenian Aura Recordings, 2019)
 Sunny Day EP (Athenian Aura Recordings, 2019)
 9 Years EP (Athenian Aura Recordings, 2019)
 Steady To Go EP (Athenian Aura Recordings, 2020)
 Back to Reality – Single (Athenian Aura Recordings, 2020)

BRUNO
 I Said No (2017)
 Santa Baby (2017)
 My Art is in Martian (2019)
 When I See the Air Turn Blue (2020)
 Rock 'n' Roll Bride (2020)
 Robot Alien (2022)

Mongoa
 Just Dust (EP, 2021)
 The Sands of Time (Single, 2021)
 Her Voice (Single, 2021)
 Silver Moon (Single, 2021)
 All My Light (Single, 2021)
 Shadows (Single, 2022)
 Old Soul (Single, 2022)
 High Above the Ocean (Single, 2022)
 Living in the Cracks (Single, 2022)

Awards

Book cover design
 The Book Designer.com Gold Star 2014
 The Book Designer.com Gold Star 2016
 The Book Designer.com Gold Star 2017
 The Book Designer.com Winner Nonfiction 2018
 IBPA Benjamin Franklin Award Silver Winner 2021
 The Wishing Shelf Awards Book Cover Design Silver Winner 2021

Literature
 Bronze Winner of the 2021 Foreword INDIES Book of the Year Awards in Science Fiction for How Icasia Bloom Touched Happiness.
 Winner in the 2021 Wishing Shelf Book Awards (Books for Adults: Fiction) for How Icasia Bloom Touched Happiness.
 Winner in the 2021 Wishing Shelf Book Awards (Books for Adults: Nonfiction) for GO: A Memoir About Binge-drinking, Self-hatred, and Finding Happiness.
 First place in The 2021 Royal Dragonfly Book Awards (Science Fiction/Fantasy) for How Icasia Bloom Touched Happiness.
 Semi-finalist in The 2017 Kindle Book Awards for Dear Reflection.
 Finalist in The 2015 Kindle Book Awards for White Lady.
 Semi-finalist in The 2013 Kindle Book Awards for The Book.
 Semi-finalist in the Goodreads Choice Awards 2012: Best Poetry for Fabric.
 The Disguised Cicada's Click, was awarded 71st place in Rhyming Poem category of the 79th Annual Writer's Digest Writing Competition 2010

Press coverage and interviews

Music
 Mxdwn Music, 19 December 2020
 Mxdwn Music, 2 December 2020

 Under the Radar Mag, 1 February 2018

 Consequence of Sound, 14 June 2017
 The Young Folks, 6 October 2017
 Dork Magazine, 18 September 2017
 Literature, The Sydney Morning Herald, 24 August 2017
 theMusic, 10 July 2017
 tmrw, 3 July 2017

 ABC Radio National's LIFE MATTERS, 17 July 2017

 Corner (CT Style), News 8, WTNH.com, 10 December 2013

Publishing
 The Creative Penn, 14 June 2021
 The Guardian, 6 March 2015
 Publishers Weekly, 20 October 2017

Articles and essays
 MamaMia.com, 8 July 2017
 The Creative Penn, 28 December 2016
 Writer's Digest, 13 July 2014

References

External links 
 

1981 births
Writers from Melbourne
Living people
Australian women writers
Australian writers